John Peachey (born 21 July 1952) is an English former professional footballer who played as a striker.

Career
Born in Cambridge, Peachey made 164 appearances in the Football League for York City, Barnsley, Darlington and Plymouth Argyle.

He also played non-league football for Hillingdon Borough and Barnstaple Town.

References

1952 births
Living people
English footballers
Association football forwards
Hillingdon Borough F.C. players
York City F.C. players
Barnsley F.C. players
Darlington F.C. players
Plymouth Argyle F.C. players
Barnstaple Town F.C. players
English Football League players